Giordano International Limited is a Hong Kong international retailer of men's, women's and children's apparel and accessories founded in 1981 by Jimmy Lai. Established in 1981, Giordano now employs over 9,100 staff with over 2,100 shops operating in more than 30 countries and regions worldwide.

Its head office is in the Tin On Industrial Building, Cheung Sha Wan, Kowloon.

History
Giordano was founded in 1981 by Jimmy Lai. Lai said the inspiration for the company's name came during a business trip to New York City. Lai found himself at a Manhattan pizza shop by the same name and woke up the next day to find a napkin printed with the Giordano name in his pocket. He decided this name would work well as it would conjure up visions and feel of Italian fashion in the consumer's mind.

The company now operates globally in a number of markets, including Hong Kong, Philippines, Taiwan, China, Macau, South Korea, the Middle East, Brunei, Singapore, Malaysia, Mauritius, Thailand, Bangladesh, Australia, Canada, Russia, Japan, Indonesia, Myanmar, Vietnam, Pakistan, Sri Lanka, Mongolia, India, Georgia, France, Zambia, South Africa, Cambodia. Jimmy Lai's association with the company ended in 1996. Dr. Peter Lau Kwok Kuen is the company's current Chairman and CEO.

China
Giordano entered the Mainland Chinese market in 1992. The first two stores were opened in Guangzhou in September 1992. Starting from the Pearl River Delta area, Giordano gradually expanded its retail network in China. It now operates over 945 stores in all major cities, with flagship stores including Nanjing Dong Lu in Shanghai and Lijiang in Yunnan.

Hong Kong
Giordano was founded in Hong Kong in 1981. The company now operates 73 shops in Hong Kong, including a 2-storey flagship store in Tsim Sha Tsui.

Taiwan
Giordano opened its first retail outlet in Taiwan in 1988. As of March 2015, Giordano operates 197 shops in Taiwan, including 3 flagship stores; namely, the Songjiang Store in Zhongshan, Taipei, the Wufu store in the Sinsing District of Kaohsiung and the Central Square Store in Taichung North District.

South Korea
The first retail outlet in South Korea opened in 1994. The company operates over 208 shops in the country. Giordano's most prominent stores include those in the Lotte Department Stores in the Pyeongchon and Garosu-gil districts, as well as its flagship stores Gangnam and Myeong-dong.

Middle East
The first retail outlet in the Middle East opened in 1993 with the outlet at Bur Juman Centre, Dubai. The company operates 240 stores in 23 countries across the region.

Giordano is one of the top five clothing retailers in the Arab region.

Its regional offices are located in Dubai, United Arab Emirates.

Brands

Giordano Men & Giordano Women
Launched in 1981, Giordano's house brand has been the core brand of the company from the outset, offering both men's and women's casual apparel and essentials.

Giordano Ladies
Giordano Ladies caters to women. Launched in 1997.

Giordano Junior
Giordano Junior offers children's wear.

BSX
First launched in 1999 as a value-oriented basics brand, Bluestar Exchange was re-branded as BSX in 2007.

Beau Monde
Beau Monde is one of Giordano's newest brands, offering basic everyday clothing at reasonable prices. Launched in 2014, Beau Monde stores are primarily located in residential and shopping districts in China and Taiwan.

It also owns G-Motion, GIORDANO Timewear, GIORDANO Travelgear, GIORDANO eyewear, CONCEPTS ONE, etc. brands.

References

External links 

 Giordano World

1981 establishments in Hong Kong
Clothing brands of Hong Kong
Clothing companies of Hong Kong
Clothing companies established in 1981
Companies listed on the Hong Kong Stock Exchange
Retail companies established in 1981